Yongin–Seoul Expressway (part of Expressway 171) is an expressway in South Korea, connecting Yongin, Gyeonggi and Gangnam-gu, Seoul. Informally known as the Gyeongsu Expressway(), it is the only expressway in South Korea not directly connected to another expressway. Although it shares the same designation number, it is not directly connected to Osan-Hwaseong Expressway either. Plans have been made to connect the Busan side of Gyeongbu Expressway and Yongin-side Geumto Tollgate.

History 
The expressway was designed to reduce traffic on the Gyeongbu Expressway with the expansion of Southern Gyeonggi. Construction started in October 2005, and was completed on July 1, 2009. The opening ceremony occurred on 30 June 2009, with Gyeonggi governor Kim Mun-su in attendance. The expressway has been open to traffic since midnight on July 1 (KST). It was built to order and is operated by Kyeongsu Expressway Corporation for 30 years. 1.5 trillion won was spent to build this expressway, with Kyeongsu Expressway Corp investing 570 billion won.

Timeline
16 September 2002: Proposal for BTO was submitted. 
23 December 2003: Kyeong-su Expressway Corp established. 
3 November 2004: Expressway number 141 is assigned for Yongin–Seoul Expressway. 
20 May 2005: Groundbreaking ceremony occurred. 
31 October 2005: Construction started for Heungdeok IC ~ Heonneung IC. 
3 January 2008: Expressway number 171 is reassigned. 
30 June 2009: Establishing ceremony occurred in Geumto Tollgate. 
1 July 2009: Heungdeok IC ~ Heonneung IC established.

Toll 
Yongin–Seoul Expressway was built and is operated by a private investment company. The toll collection system is different from how Korea Expressway collects tolls. Toll fees were originally 1,800 won, but later raised to 2,000 won. 1,100 won is collected at W. Suji Tollgate, and 900 Won is collected at Geumto Tollgate. Traffic from Heungdeok interchange and Gwanggyo-Sanghyeon interchange leaving W. Suji Tollgate pay an additional 600 won. The same applies for vehicles entering W. Suji in the direction of Heungdeok.

Composition 
Lanes
 Godeung IC ~ Heonneung IC: 4 lanes
 Heungdeok IC ~ Godeung IC: 6 lanes

 Length 
 22.9 Km

Speed limit
 All area Max. 100 km/h

List of facilities 

 Number stands for IC and JC number, TG stands for Tollgate, SA for Service Area.

See also 
 Pyeongtaek-Hwaseong Expressway
 Osan-Hwaseong Expressway

Footnotes

References

External links 
 Kyeongsu expressway Corp

Transport infrastructure completed in 2009
Expressways in South Korea
Roads in Gyeonggi
Roads in Seoul